The following is a list of 2023 box office number-one films in Italy.

Highest-grossing films of 2023

See also
 List of 2022 box office number-one films in Italy

References

External links

2023
Italy
2023 in Italian cinema